Simpsonville is a city in Greenville County, South Carolina, United States. It is part of the Greenville–Mauldin–Easley Metropolitan Statistical Area. The population was 22,234 at the 2020 census, up from 18,238 in 2010. Simpsonville is part of the "Golden Strip", along with Mauldin and Fountain Inn, an area which is noted for having low unemployment due to a diversity of industries including H.B. Fuller, KEMET, Sealed Air and Milliken.

History
The Burdette Building, Cureton-Huff House, Hopkins Farm, and Simpsonville Baptist Church are listed on the National Register of Historic Places.

The oldest brick building in town is a former pharmacy built in 1886 on East Curtis Street. The Woodside Mill, central to the local economy in the early 1900s, includes an antique water tower.

In October 2018, a winning lottery ticket for a $1.6 billion Mega Millions jackpot was sold at the #7 KC Mart in Simpsonville.

Geography
Simpsonville is located in southeastern Greenville County at  (34.733375, -82.260001), between Mauldin to the northwest and Fountain Inn to the southeast.

South Carolina Highway 14 runs through the center of Simpsonville as Main Street, leading north  to Greer and southeast  to the center of Fountain Inn. Interstate 385 passes through Simpsonville west of the city center, with access from exits 26 through 29. I-385 leads northwest  to the center of Greenville and southeast  to Interstate 26 near Clinton.

Demographics

2020 census

As of the 2020 United States census, there were 23,354 people, 8,464 households, and 6,104 families residing in the city. The population density was 2,732.9 people per square mile (916.2 per km2). There were 9,044 housing units at an average density of 1,016.2 per square mile (392.2 per km2). 24.1% of the population was under 18, and 14.4% of the population was over 65. 51.3% of the population was female.

The median annual income for a household in the city was $71,990, and the per capita income was $32,821. 5.4% of the population were below the poverty line.

Crime
Simpsonville's 2006 crime statistics were higher than national average crime rates. Violent crimes in 2010 totalled 82 for the year. 2006 statistics of violent crime in Simpsonville reflect there was not one murder, reported incidents of rape were slightly higher than the national average (39 per 100,000 in Simpsonville, with a national average of 33 per 100,000), and incidents of aggravated assaults were what tipped the 2006 violent crime scales, tallying in at 75% over the national average. In 2007 the personal crime incidents rate tallied in at 6 per 1000 residents, while the national average was 1.3 per 1000. In September 2007, the FBI reported that the state of South Carolina's violent crime rate was the highest in the nation per capita, although Simpsonville is not mentioned at all in the article. Simpsonville car theft in 2006 was lower than the national average, calling into question claims that Simpsonville had a high rate of car-jackings.

In 2017, Simpsonville was named the safest city in South Carolina, based on FBI Crime Report data gathered by the SafeWise security organization; its ranking as of 2021 is 15th.

Emergency services
The Simpsonville Police Department was founded in 1907 and its first police chief was hired in 1928. Citizen-based programs were added in 2014 that provide opportunities for civilians to work alongside police officers. The current chief of police is Michael D. Hanshaw.

The Simpsonville Fire Department was formed in 1922. Fire protection was supported by annual contract fees until the mid-1980s when a tax system was adopted instead. The department's current fire chief is Wesley Williams.

Government
Simpsonville is governed by a city council, consisting of a mayor and six council members, one from each city ward. The city also has several boards and commissions to advise the council and complete assigned tasks. The council is elected in November of odd years to staggered four-year terms. The current council includes:

 Mayor: Paul Shewmaker (1st term ends 12-31-2023)
 Council Ward I: Matthew Gooch (3rd term ends 12-31-2023)
 Council Ward II: Aaron Rupe (1st term ends 12-31-2025)
 Council Ward III: Jenn Hulehan (2nd term ends 12-31-2023)
 Council Ward IV: Sherry Roche (2nd term ends 12-31-2025)
 Council Ward V: Ken Cummings (2nd term ends 12-31-2023)
 Council Ward VI: Lou Hutchings (2nd term ends 12-31-2025)

The city council appoints a city administrator, who serves at their pleasure, to work with them in the proper administration of the city's policies and affairs. The council also appoints a city clerk, city treasurer, and city attorney, who serve indefinite terms at the pleasure of City Council. The current city officers include:

 City Administrator: Dianna Gracely (since 2018)
 City Clerk: Phyllis Long
 City Treasurer: Christine Furino
 City Attorney: Daniel Hughes

Education
Public education in Simpsonville is administered by Greenville County School District. The district operates five schools in Simpsonville. Hillcrest High School, Hillcrest Middle School, Bryson Middle School, Simpsonville Elementary School, and Plain Elementary School.

Abiding Peace Academy is a K2-5 grade school of the Wisconsin Evangelical Lutheran Synod in Simpsonville.

Simpsonville has a public library, a branch of the Greenville County Library System.

Culture and sports
Simpsonville's CCNB Amphitheatre at Heritage Park, named for sponsor Coastal Carolina National Bank, is an outdoor entertainment venue with seating for up to 15,000.  It has hosted performers and community events since 2005.

The Simpsonville Arts Center hosts performing arts by the Mill Town Players of Pelzer. Renovation of the center was completed in February 2022.

The Women's American Basketball Association established a team based in Simpsonville to begin its first season in July 2021. Home games for the Carolina Upstate Thunder are to be played in Greenville.

Media
The Simpsonville Sentinel is the local area newspaper, published monthly. The news website Patch also has a Simpsonville edition.

Simpsonville is part of the Greenville-Spartanburg-Anderson-Asheville DMA television market. Local television stations include:

Simsponville is part of the Greenville-Spartanburg-Anderson Arbitron Metro radio market. Station WYRD-FM is licensed in and transmits from Simpsonville. Other local radio stations include:

Notable people
 Justin Bolli, professional golfer
 Danielle Brooks, actress, stars in Orange Is the New Black and was Tony Award-nominated for role as Sofia on Broadway in The Color Purple.
 Chandler Catanzaro, American football placekicker
 Lucas Glover, PGA Tour golfer, winner of 2009 U.S. Open Golf Championship
 Shane Hall, NASCAR driver
 Tommy Jones, professional bowler; 2005–06 PBA Player of the Year
 Jamon Meredith, offensive tackle, 2009 fifth-round draft pick of NFL's Green Bay Packers
 Emilio Pagan, pitcher for MLB's San Diego Padres
 Stephen Thompson, UFC fighter
 Travelle Wharton, offensive tackle for NFL's Carolina Panthers

References

External links

 City of Simpsonville official website

   

 
Cities in South Carolina
Cities in Greenville County, South Carolina
Upstate South Carolina